Qelich Khan Kandi (also Romanized as Qelīch Khān Kandī; also known as Qelīch Khānlū) is a village in Aslan Duz Rural District, Aslan Duz District, Parsabad County, Ardabil Province, Iran. At the 2006 census, its population was 218, in 35 families.

References 

Towns and villages in Parsabad County